Tower Fall is a waterfall on Tower Creek in the northeastern region of Yellowstone National Park, in the U.S. state of Wyoming. Its name comes from the rock pinnacles at the top of the fall. Tower Creek and Tower Fall are located approximately three miles south of Roosevelt Junction on the Tower-Canyon road.

History
On September 15–16, 1869, members of the Cook–Folsom–Peterson Expedition spent a whole day in the Tower Fall area before crossing the river and traveling up the East Fork of the Yellowstone (Lamar River).

In August 1870, the Washburn-Langford-Doane Expedition camped near and explored the Tower Fall area for several days en route to Yellowstone Lake. In his 1871 report to Secretary of War Gustavus C. Doane, a member of the expedition described Tower Falls thus:

The fall was named by Samuel Hauser, a member of the Washburn party. Hauser made this notation in his diary on August 27, 1870:

The fall was renamed Tower Fall (singular) by the U.S. Geological Survey in 1928.

A well-known painting by Thomas Moran in 1871 helped persuade Congress to set aside Yellowstone as the world's first national park in 1872.

Images of Tower Fall

See also
 Waterfalls in Yellowstone National Park

Notes

Landforms of Park County, Wyoming
Waterfalls of Yellowstone National Park
Waterfalls of Wyoming
Plunge waterfalls